Coming Out Alive is a 1980 Canadian television thriller film starring Helen Shaver, Scott Hylands, and Michael Ironside while being directed by Don McBrearty.

Plot
After mother Isobel's disabled son Nicky is kidnapped by her estranged husband, she hires a hitman to reclaim him.

Cast

Release
The film was released to video in the US by Trans World Entertainment in 1984.

References

External links
 

Canadian thriller drama films
Canadian drama television films
1980 films
English-language Canadian films
Films directed by Don McBrearty
1980s Canadian films